The Expert Soldier Badge, or ESB, is a special skills badge of the United States Army. Similar in appearance to the Combat Action Badge, the ESB is awarded to soldiers who are neither infantry, special forces, nor combat medics who demonstrate their competence in various warrior and mission essential tasks, land navigation, and physical fitness. The badge was approved on June 14, 2019 and entered service in October 2019, as a way for soldiers in other military occupational specialties to certify their competence within their occupation, as well as general combat skills.

History
The concept of the ESB (initially referred to as the Expert Action Badge) was initially proposed in 2015 as part of the United States Army Training and Doctrine Command's Non-Commissioned Officer (NCO) 2020 Strategy, as one way to improve combat readiness in the Army.  The ESB was first openly discussed on March 30, 2017, at an NCO Development Town Hall hosted by Command Sergeant Major David Davenport. Discussion mainly focused on the intent of the badge, as well as the possible criteria for award. The feasibility of the ESB was tested at Joint Base Lewis-McChord in April of the same year, with 53 soldiers taking part in the event. The results of the test at McChord, as well as future testing, will be used to determine if the criteria for the badge appropriately conveys the badge's intent. The NCO 2020 Strategy, including the ESB, was further discussed in 2018 at a conference held at Fort Knox.

Criteria
The criteria for award of the ESB is that a soldier must perform in 30 Warrior Tasks (Skill Level 1) and battle drills, and five unit–level mission essential tasks, chosen by a commander, in addition to completion of a 12-mile foot march, a land navigation test and the Army Combat Fitness Test. Testing is conducted at the brigade-level, with units being given a week to set up the test course, a few days of training, and then a few days of testing.

Design

The design for the ESB is similar to that of the Combat Action Badge. It features the same M9 bayonet and  M67 fragmentation grenade, superimposed on a rectangular base, as found on the Combat Action Badge. The ESB does not, however, feature a wreath.

See also
 Badges of the United States Army
 Military badges of the United States
 Uniforms of the United States Army

References

Awards and decorations of the United States Department of Defense
United States military badges
Awards and decorations of the United States Army
Awards established in 2019
2019 establishments in the United States